Charles Douglas Frazier (August 12, 1939 – August 16, 2022) was an American professional football player who was a wide receiver for nine seasons in the American Football League (AFL) and the National Football League (NFL). He played for the Houston Oilers and Boston Patriots from 1962 to 1970. Frazier was an AFL All-Star in 1966.

Early life
Frazier was born in Houston on August 12, 1939.  He attended Marshall High School in nearby Angleton, Texas. He then studied at Texas Southern University, where he starred for the Texas Southern Tigers on its track and field team. He was teammates with future New York Giants receiver Homer Jones. Frazier ran the 100-yard dash in 9.4 seconds and 220 yards in 20.8 seconds. He did not play college football, and was undrafted after graduating in 1962.

Professional career
Despite a lack of college football experience, Frazier signed with the Houston Oilers of the American Football League (AFL) prior to the 1962 AFL season. With George Blanda and Don Trull at quarterback, Frazier totaled 1,129 receiving yards and 12 touchdown receptions in the 1966 season. His 12 touchdown receptions were the second-most in the AFL that year, trailing only Lance Alworth's 13. Frazier was named to the East's 1966 AFL All-Star team for his accomplishments. In the All-Star game, Frazier scored the game-winning touchdown on a 17-yard pass from Vito Parilli.

In March 1969, the Oilers traded Frazier, Sid Blanks, Ronnie Caveness, and Larry Carwell to the Boston Patriots for Leroy Mitchell. The Patriots placed Frazier on the move list in December 1970, rendering him ineligible to play for the remainder of that season. He retired with 207 receptions, 3,452 receiving yards, and 29 touchdowns.

Later life
After retiring from professional football, Frazier spent several seasons coaching in the high school and college ranks.  He coached at Rice University, the University of Tulsa and Texas Christian University (TCU). After spending six seasons at TCU, he returned to Houston and became a teacher and coach at Reagan High School. When he retired from teaching in 2006, he became a team ambassador for the Houston Texans of the National Football League.

Frazier died on the evening of August 16, 2022, four days after his 83rd birthday.

See also
 List of American Football League players

References

External links 
 

1939 births
2022 deaths
American football wide receivers
Houston Oilers players
Boston Patriots players
American Football League All-Star players
Texas Southern Tigers football players
American Football League players
Players of American football from Houston